The 1991–92 Alpenliga season was the first season of the Alpenliga, a multi-national ice hockey league. The league was split into Group A and Group B. 20 teams participated in the league, and HC Devils Milano of Italy won the championship.

Regular season

Group A

Group B

Play-offs

Semi-finals
Milan (A1) – HC Bolzano (B2): 3:4 (0:0, 2:2, 1:2)
HC Devils Milano (B1) – VSV (A2): 4:2 (1:2, 2:0, 1:0)

3rd place
HC Milan (A1) – VSV (A2): 5:6 n.V. (2:0, 1:2, 2:3, 0:1)

Final
Devils Milano (B1) – HC Bolzano (B2): 8:0 (2:0, 3:0, 3:0)

External links
1991-92 season

Alpenliga seasons
2
Alpenliga
Alpenliga